For the FM station in Waynesville, Ohio see WYNS-FM

Wyns is a village in Tytsjerksteradiel municipality in the province of  Friesland, the Netherlands.It had a population of approximately 228 in January 2017.

History
The village was first mentioned in 1224 as Winenge, and means "settlement of the people of Wago (person)".

The Protestant church that was built around 1200 has been renovated to form a multifunctional centre. Wyns was in the Middle Ages notable for all lawsuits of Eastergoa being held there and the Grietmans sometimes holding meetings in the church.

Wyns home was to 110 people in 1840. The polder mill Wynzer Mûne was built in 1871. It remained in service until 1975 when a Diesel powered pumping station was built. The wind mill is designated as an emergency backup. In 1893, a dairy factory was built in Wyns. It has redesigned as a ship wharf. Near the inn, there is ferry across the Dokkumer Ee.

Notable buildings
 The Protestant church of Wyns

Gallery

References

Populated places in Friesland
Tytsjerksteradiel